Michael Myers (February 1, 1753 – February 17, 1814) was an American lawyer and politician from New York.

Early life
Myers was born on February 1, 1753, in Elizabethtown, Province of New Jersey (now Elizabeth, New Jersey). A veteran of the American Revolutionary War, Myers fought in the Battle of Johnstown in 1781, and was severely wounded.

Career 
From 1791 to 1805, he was an associate judge of the Herkimer County Court.

He was a member of the New York State Assembly, from Montgomery County in 1789–90 and 1791; and from Herkimer County in 1792 and 1792–93. He was a member of the New York State Senate from 1793 to 1801.

Personal life 
Myers had two children. He died on February 17, 1814, in Herkimer, New York.

References

1753 births
1814 deaths
Politicians from Elizabeth, New Jersey
People from Herkimer, New York
Members of the New York State Assembly
New York (state) state senators
New York (state) Federalists
New York (state) state court judges